The Boulton & Paul P.9 was a British single-engined two-seat biplane aircraft built by Boulton & Paul Ltd.

Design and development
The P.9 was an enlarged development of the P.6 single-engined biplane, with a  longer fuselage and a  increase in span. It used the same  RAF 1 V-8 engine as the P.6 but with an increased fuel capacity. The wings and fuselage were constructed of wood with fabric covering.

The first order was from A.L. Long for use on a sheep station in Australia and the first aircraft was delivered to Australia where it was used on newspaper delivery flights. On 17 December 1919, it made the first flight across the Bass Strait between Tasmania and the mainland. Minor changes were then made to production aircraft, including a compartment behind the cockpit to carry two specially-built suitcases. Although the aircraft was offered at £700, with an old but still commonly available engine, it failed to compete with war-surplus military aircraft and only eight aircraft were built, including three that went to Australia.

Specifications

References

Notes

Bibliography

 

P.009
1910s British civil utility aircraft
Single-engined tractor aircraft
Biplanes
Aircraft first flown in 1919